This is a list of former Universal Studios Hollywood Attractions.

Former attractions

Former services 
Upper Lot
 Time Travelers Depot (Back to the Future: The Ride) removed in 2003, now Kwik-E-Mart (The Simpsons Ride)
 T2 Gear & Supply Co (T2-3D: Battle Across Time) closed in 2012, now Super Silly Stuff (Despicable Me Minion Mayhem)
 Cyber Grill (T2-3D: Battle Across Time) closed in 2012, now Minion's Cafe (Despicable Me Minion Mayhem) 
 Nickelodeon Stuff (Nickelodeon Blast Zone) removed in September 2013
 Studio Souvenirs (Studio Tour) closed in September 2013
 Hollywood Cantina closed in January 2014, now Springfield (The Simpsons)
 Doc Brown's Chicken (Back to the Future: The Ride) closed in January 2014, now Springfield (The Simpsons)
 Hollywood Shoppe closed in early 2014, now Palace Theatre Café
 International Cafe closed in May 2014, rethemed as French Street Bistro
 Finlays closed in May/June 2014.
 Louie's Pizza & Pasta closed January 2015, re-themed as Luigi's Pizza as part of Springfield (The Simpsons)
 Ben & Jerry's closed late 2014, re-themed as Phineas Q. Butterfat's Ice Cream Parlor as part of Springfield (The Simpsons)
Lower Lot
 Universal Studios Commissary closed in 2003, now Panda Express
 E.T.'s Toy Closet (E.T. Adventure) closed in 2003 and are now lockers for Revenge of the Mummy
 Energon Recharging Station (Transformers: The Ride 3D) removed in February 2014
 Lower Lot Arcade closed on April 1, 2014, now Starbucks Coffee
 Tomb Treasures (Revenge of the Mummy) closed and replaced with Studio Store

See also
 List of former Universal Studios Florida attractions
 List of former Universal Studios Japan attractions

References

External links
 thestudiotour.com Universal Studios Hollywood Past Attractions

Lists of former buildings and structures
Lists of former amusement park attractions

Universal Parks & Resorts lists